Leto Destinatus is the debut album by Australian metal band, Universum. This album was mixed and mastered by Jens Bogren of Sweden's Fascination Street Studios and is available through Australia's largest heavy music distributor Riot Entertainment, which the band is also signed to.

Track listing
All music written by Michael Soininen except where noted.

Credits

Universum
Adam Soininen – harsh vocals
Michael Soininen – lead and rhythm guitar, clean vocals
Jaron Soininen – drums
Stephen Murphy – rhythm and lead guitar
Liam Brophy – bass
Rachael Madden - keyboards

Guest musicians
Tomy Laisto - guest guitar

Production
Jens Bogren - Mixing/Mastering
Universum - Producer
Artwork by Gus (Sonic Syndicate, Firewind)

References

External links
 Official Website
 MySpace Website
 YouTube Website

2008 debut albums
Universum (band) albums